Silver Springs Shores is a census-designated place (CDP) in Marion County, Florida, United States. The population was 24,846 at the 2020 census. It is part of the Ocala Metropolitan Statistical Area.

The community, often referred to by locals as simply "the shores", serves primarily as a bedroom community for Ocala. It is the largest community in southeast Marion County.

Geography
Silver Springs Shores is located at  (29.101279, -82.012439).

Demographics

As of the census of 2000, there were 6,690 people, 2,846 households, and 1,886 families residing in the CDP. The racial makeup of the CDP was 63.36% White, 28.45% African American, 0.31% Native American, 1.08% Asian, 3.35% from other races, and 3.45% from two or more races. Hispanic or Latino of any race were 12.08% of the population.

There were 2,846 households, out of which 24.3% had children under the age of 18 living with them, 48.1% were married couples living together, 14.8% had a female householder with no husband present, and 33.7% were non-families. 29.0% of all households were made up of individuals, and 19.5% had someone living alone who was 65 years of age or older.  The average household size was 2.34 and the average family size was 2.87.

In the CDP, the population was spread out, with 23.9% under the age of 18, 5.9% from 18 to 24, 22.2% from 25 to 44, 19.0% from 45 to 64, and 29.1% who were 65 years of age or older.  The median age was 43 years. For every 100 females, there were 80.5 males.  For every 100 females age 18 and over, there were 76.6 males.

The median income for a household in the CDP was $26,493, and the median income for a family was $30,723. Males had a median income of $24,798 versus $18,279 for females. The per capita income for the CDP was $13,884.  About 8.9% of families and 12.0% of the population were below the poverty line, including 18.5% of those under age 18 and 9.7% of those age 65 or over.

Schools
Most elementary-level students are served by Greenway Elementary and Emerald Shores Elementary schools; most middle school students attend Lake Weir Middle School, with the exception of the far western part of the community attending Fort King Middle School in Ocala. Most high school students attend Lake Weir High School which is located on Oak Road, with the remainder of the students in the far western part of the community attending Forest High School

References

Census-designated places in Marion County, Florida
Census-designated places in Florida